Identity (stylized in all caps) is the second studio album by American drag queen and singer-songwriter Blair St. Clair, released on July 21, 2020. The song "Space Between" features Rayvon Owen.

Promotion
The album's lead single "Empty" was released on April 30, 2020 alongside an accompanying lyric video. "9 Lives" was performed on the premiere of the fifth season of RuPaul's Drag Race All Stars and released as the second single on June 11, 2020, along with a music video directed by St. Clair herself.

"Space Between", featuring American Idol season 14 contestant Rayvon Owen was released as a promotional single on June 16, 2020. Following this, St. Clair released a new song every week counting down until the album's release. "What Do I Gotta Do?", "All Your Exes", "Wanted", "Bad Judgement", and "Take Me Home" were all released as promotional singles on June 23, June 30, July 7, July 14, and July 18, 2020.

Reception
Bernardo Sim of ScreenRant wrote: "On "9 Lives," Blair St. Clair reflects on the finitude and value of life, and grapples with the realization that she must hold herself accountable in this high-stakes world. Blair also rehashes the old adage that people only have one chance to prove themselves, making it imperative for them to seize the moment when an opportunity presents itself. Considering that the queen is currently competing on All Stars 5, the song certainly reads as Blair's self-reminder to not hold herself back."

Track listing
Credits taken from Allmusic and Tidal

Credits and personnel
Credits adapted from Allmusic

 Andrew Bryson – Composer, Vocals
 Caroline Burns – Composer
 Malia Civetz – Composer
 Sam Creighton – Composer
 Nick Dipietrantonio – Composer
 Dreux – Producer
 Nathan Fertig – Composer
 Nick Goldston – Composer, Producer
 Will Jay – Composer
 Jack Laboz – Composer
 Tyler Mann – Composer
 Maylyn Murphy – Composer
 Nicopop – Composer, Producer
 Parker James Noones – Composer
 Rayvon Owen – Featured Artist
 Blair St. Clair – Primary Artist, Vocals
 Doma Schrank – Composer
 Colleen Evalyn Sherman – Composer
 Jonny Shorr – Composer, Producer
 Brandon Stansell – Composer
 Ryan Stewart – Composer
 Maggie Szabo – Composer
 Mathew Peter Van Vooght – Composer

References

2020 albums
Blair St. Clair albums
Producer Entertainment Group albums